Kasangulu is a town in Kongo Central Province in the Democratic Republic of the Congo. It has a population of 27,960.

Transport 

It is served by a station on the Matadi–Kinshasa Railway.

See also 

 Railway stations in DRCongo

References 

Populated places in Kongo Central